Vuk Radjenovic (Serbian Cyrillic: Вук Рађеновић) (born 7 June 1983 in Ključ, Bosnia and Herzegovina) is a Germany-resident Serbian bobsledder who has competed since 2001. His best World Cup finish was 11th in a four-men event at Igls in 2013, considered a remarkable performance due to financial struggles of his national federation. Vuk and the Serbian Bobsleigh Team became known as people that "create a lot with nothing". His best two-man World Cup result is 18th in Igls in 2012. Rađenović finished 2012/13 World Cup season in 26th place of Men's Four-Man with 352 . He was selected to compete at the 2010 Winter Olympics in the four-man event where he finished 18th. His best world cup results are 2010: 2man in Lake Placid, NY, USA, 16th place; and 2012: 2man in St Moritz Switzerland, 18th place.

Olympic results

References

Vancouver2010.com profile.

1983 births
Bobsledders at the 2002 Winter Olympics
Bobsledders at the 2010 Winter Olympics
Bobsledders at the 2014 Winter Olympics
Living people
Olympic bobsledders of Serbia
Yugoslav male bobsledders
Serbian male bobsledders
Olympic bobsledders of Yugoslavia
People from Una-Sana Canton